Hette Glacier is a glacier,  long, flowing north between the Hettene Nunataks and Austhamaren Peak in the Sør Rondane Mountains of Antarctica. It was mapped by Norwegian cartographers in 1957 from air photos taken by U.S. Navy Operation Highjump, 1946–47, and named Hettebreen (the cap glacier).

See also
 List of glaciers in the Antarctic
 Glaciology

References

 

Glaciers of Queen Maud Land
Princess Ragnhild Coast